The Charles Newton House is a historic house at 24 Brattle Street in Worcester, Massachusetts.

Description and history 
The original owner of the house was Charles Newton, a farmer. The exact date of construction is not known, but it was most likely between 1846, when Newton acquired the land, and the early 1850s, when the house was first noted in the city directories. About 1861 Newton sold the property to Calvin Foster, railroad financier and founder and president of the City National Bank of Worcester. In 1890 Foster sold the house to architect James E. Fuller of the well-known firm of Fuller & Delano, who lived there until his death in 1901. Fuller's sons, also architects, built their own houses on the property. J. Edward Fuller, the elder, built his house at what is now numbered 40 Brattle Street about 1896, while Robert L. Fuller, the younger, had built his at 14 Brattle Street by 1911.

Likely built in 1840s, the -story wood-frame house is a rare local example of a house transitional between Federal and Greek Revival styling. The side hall, front gable plan is typically Greek Revival, but some details are Federal, such as the narrow corner boards. The doorway, flanked by sidelight windows and surrounded by an architrave with corner and center blocks, was derived from designs published by Asher Benjamin. The house's northern wing and main stair, featuring Colonial Revival details, was likely an addition added by Fuller.

The house was listed on the National Register of Historic Places in 1980.

See also
National Register of Historic Places listings in northwestern Worcester, Massachusetts
National Register of Historic Places listings in Worcester County, Massachusetts

Notes

References

Houses completed in 1833
Houses in Worcester, Massachusetts
National Register of Historic Places in Worcester, Massachusetts
Houses on the National Register of Historic Places in Worcester County, Massachusetts
Greek Revival architecture in Massachusetts